Cambambe is a municipality in Cuanza Norte Province in Angola. It is the site of a hydroelectric dam on the Cuanza River. Cambambe also contains ruins from the 17th-century Portuguese settlement of the area, including the Church of Nossa Senhora do Rosario and the Fortress of Kambambe. The municipality had a population of 90,766 in 2014.

References

Populated places in Cuanza Norte Province
Municipalities of Angola